The Eastman Business College was a business school located in Poughkeepsie, New York, United States. It operated from 1859 until it closed in 1931. At the height of its success, the school was one of the largest commercial colleges in the United States.

History

Eastman Business College was founded by Harvey G. Eastman in Poughkeepsie, New York in 1859. Rather than merely being a theoretical school, students gained practical experience in the business arts by actually performing the tasks that would be expected of them in their working careers, a novel approach at the time.

In 1897, Eastman Business College had a Business Department which offered hands-on practice in a mock bank and mock railway and express office, and also taught bookkeeping. The college also included a School of Shorthand which trained students in shorthand, typing, duplicating, and filing. In addition, there was a School of Penmanship, which prepared students to teach writing and pen art. Eastman's School of Telegraphy trained students as telegraph operators.

The 1898 catalogs of the Eastman Business College and its affiliated school, the New York Business Institute stated "These schools do not receive students of the Negro Race". In 1905 S. V. Daniels, a 17-year-old from St. Thomas, Virgin Islands withdrew from the main college and transferred to the Harlem branch following the petition of 160 southern students alleging that he was partially of African descent.

During its most successful period in the late 1800s and early 1900s, Eastman was one of the largest commercial schools in the United States. The college closed on June 10, 1931.

Notable alumni

 Martin F. Allen, Vermont politician
 Dwight L. Burgess, Wisconsin politician
 Harry C. Bentley, founder of Bentley University
 Ernest Cady, Lieutenant Governor of Connecticut
 Edmund Elisha Case, painter
 LeRoy Collins, Governor of Florida
 Porter Dale, United States Senator from Vermont
 Henry T. DeBardeleben, coal magnate
 Henry S. De Forest, United States Representative from New York
 Nelson W. Fisk, Vermont businessman and Lieutenant Governor
 Obadiah Gardner, United States Senator from Maine
 Thomas Goldie, Canadian politician
 Henry Mayer Halff, rancher
 William P. G. Harding, banker
 Robert Henry Hendershot, American Civil War drummer boy
 Mark C. Honeywell, US electronics industrialist; founder, President and CEO of Honeywell International
 John L. Jolley, United States Congressman from South Dakota
 Mahlon Kline, pharmaceutical executive
 Joseph B. Keeler, Brigham Young University faculty member
 S. S. Kresge, retail businessman
 Monroe Henry Kulp, United States Representative from Pennsylvania
 Lorenzo D. Lewelling, 12th Governor of Kansas
 John Hamilton Morgan, LDS official
 John M. Parker, Governor of Louisiana from 1920 to 1924
 Edmund Platt, United States Representative from New York
 John Reber, United States Representative from Pennsylvania
 Daniel Elmer Salmon, veterinary surgeon
 Samuel Roger Smith, founder of Messiah College
 Reuben L. Snowe, Maine politician
 Calvert Spensley, Wisconsin politician
 Thomas Bahnson Stanley, Governor of Virginia
 Nelson Story, Montana pioneer
 James E. Towner, New York politician
 Murray Vandiver, Maryland politician
 Frank B. Weeks, Governor of Connecticut
 Homer W. Wheeler, U.S. Army officer and author
 Timothy Woodruff, United States Congressman and Lieutenant Governor of New York 
 William Ziegler, industrialist

References

Further reading
"Daniels Leaves College", Washington Post, April 18, 1905
A Brief History of Eastman Business College, 1875

External links
 Office Museum

Defunct private universities and colleges in New York (state)
Educational institutions established in 1859
Educational institutions disestablished in 1931
1859 establishments in New York (state)
1931 disestablishments in New York (state)
Education in Poughkeepsie, New York